Events from the year 1522 in Sweden

Incumbents
 Monarch – Christian

Events

 - Örebro Castle is taken by the rebels. 
 - Västerås Castle is taken by the rebels. 
 - The Danish fleet burns Åbo. 
 - The Danish fleet under command of Søren Norby reach the besieged Stockholm.
 - Gustav Vasa makes a treaty with Hanseatic Lübeck and establishes the Swedish fleet.  
 - Lübeck declare war against Denmark.
 - Lübeck and Danzig form an alliance with Frederick I of Denmark against Christian II of Denmark. 
 - With the assistance of the fleet provided by their Hanseatic allies, the Swedes conquer all the strongholds in Sweden-Finland except for Stockholm, Kalmar and Älvsborg.
 - The Swedish fleet rebuff another rescue expedition of Sören Norby to Stockholm.

Births

Deaths

 22 July - Arvid Kurck, bishop (born 1464)

References

 
Years of the 16th century in Sweden
Sweden